Heinrich Schaefer (1883–1943) was a German writer.

Schaefer was an employee of Die Aktion.

Publications
 (1903) Pfarrkirche und Stift im deutschen Mittelalter. Berlin: F. Enke
 (1912) Waffenstudien zur Thidrekssaga. Berlin: Mayer & Müller
 (1914) Niedergang und Erhebung der Kulturmenschheit. Berlin: Erik Hofmann & Co
 (1918) Drei Erzählungen. Berlin: Die Aktion

References

1883 births
1943 deaths
German socialists